Phil Wittliff (born 1948) is an American former ice hockey player, coach, and executive.

Known affectionately as "Mr. Admiral", Wittlifff was involved with the Milwaukee Admirals from his days as a player starting with the 1972-73 season, until his retirement in July 2006 when he stepped away from his role as General Manager and Executive Vice President of Hockey Operations.

References

External links

1948 births
People from Port Huron, Michigan
American ice hockey coaches
Ice hockey people from Michigan
Jersey Devils players
Living people
Milwaukee Admirals players
Notre Dame Fighting Irish men's ice hockey players
Port Huron Wings players
American men's ice hockey centers
Sportspeople from Metro Detroit
Ice hockey coaches from Michigan
Ice hockey players from Michigan